Rocío San Miguel (born 1966 in Caracas, Venezuela) is a lawyer and human rights activist, specialising in military issues. She is also the president of the NGO Control Ciudadano, a civil association whose objective is the supervision of citizens in terms of national security, defense, and the armed forces. She also supervises the commitments that the Venezuelan state has to the Rome Statute and the Inter-American Human Rights Commission.

Harassment and defamation 
Rocío San Miguel has suffered from constant harassment from groups hired by the Venezuelan government and from anonymous people, as well as from defamation through various methods on television, radio, and in print. On 18 January 2012, the Inter-American Commission of Human Rights issued cautionary methods of protection for San Miguel and her daughter.

Months later, on 29 June 2012, the Bolivarian Intelligence Service (SEBIN) broke into the house of her brother, José Manuel San Miguel. On 25 March 2014, president Nicolás Maduro made defamatory statements in a national broadcast against San Miguel, and accused her of being involved in an attempted coup. A few days before, on 18 March 2014, a stranger approached her while she was in her vehicle and threatened her repeatedly. On 2 May 2014, the then-Minister for Interior and Justice, Miguel Rodríguez Torres, accused San Miguel of being a spy. San Miguel has also been repeatedly attacked by Diosdado Cabello on his television show Con el Mazo Dando.

See also 

 Gonzalo Himiob
 Carlos Correa
 Liliana Ortega

References

External links 
 Control Ciudadano website

People from Caracas
Venezuelan women lawyers
Venezuelan human rights activists
1966 births
Living people
20th-century Venezuelan lawyers
21st-century Venezuelan lawyers